Agazarian is a surname. Notable people with the surname include:

Francine Agazarian (1913–1999), French Resistance member
Jack Agazarian (1915–1945), British spy
Noel Agazarian (1916–1941), British World War II flying ace
Yvonne Agazarian (1929–2017), American psychologist